The Moore Market Complex–Tirupati MEMU is a MEMU passenger service belonging to Southern Railway zone that runs between  and  in India. It is currently being operated with 66015/66014 train numbers on a daily basis. It was announced in 2013 rail budget.

Service

The 66015/Moore Market Complex–Tirupati MEMU has an average speed of 37 km/hr and covers 147 km in 4h. The 66014/Tirupati–Moore Market Complex MEMU has an average speed of 34 km/hr and covers 147 km in 4h 15m.

Route and halts 

The important halts of the train are:

Coach composition

The train has standard ICF rakes with a max speed of 110 kmph. The train consists of 16 coaches:

 6 General Unreserved

Direction reversal

The train reverses its direction 1 times:

See also 

 Tirupati railway station
 Moore Market Complex railway station
 Chennai Central–Tirupati Express

Notes

References

External links 

 66015/Moore Market Complex - Tirupati MEMU
 66014/Tirupati - Moore Market Complex MEMU

Transport in Chennai
Transport in Tirupati
Electric multiple units of India
Rail transport in Andhra Pradesh
Rail transport in Tamil Nadu
Railway services introduced in 2011